The 6th constituency of Puy-de-Dôme was a French legislative constituency in the Puy-de-Dôme département in the Auvergne region of France.  It was eliminated in the 2010 Redistricting of French Legislative Constituencies.

The 6th constituency of Puy-de-Dôme was eliminated based on 2010 redistricting mandated by Law No. 86-1197 of 24 November 1986.  Before its excision, the 6th constituency consisted of the cantons of Aigueperse, Combronde, Ennezat, Manzat, Menat, Montaigut, Pionsat, Pontaumur, Pontgibaud, Randan, Riom-Est, Riom-Ouest and Saint-Gervais-d'Auvergne. The cantons and communes that once made up the 6th constituency were merged with Puy-de-Dôme's 2nd constituency.

Assembly Members

Election results

2007

Sources

 Official results of French elections from 2007: 

Puy-de-Dôme
Defunct French legislative constituencies